Huma River may refer to:

 Huma River (Romania) in Romania
 Huma River (China), formerly also known as Houmar River, a tributary of the Amur River in Huma County, Heilongjiang Province of China

See also 
 Huma (disambiguation)